Buchlyvie United Football Club are a Scottish association football club currently playing in the Forth and Endrick Football League. The club was formed in 1910 and have won the Forth and Endrick Football League once in their history, in 1982.

History

The village of Buchlyvie has had a football team in various guises for over 100 years, Buchlyvie was actually one of the founder members of the local Forth & Endrick league in 1910. The club had its most successful decade in the 1980s winning their only league trophy in 1982, as well as the Telfer Cup in 1984, and most recently the Cameron Cup in 2018.

Competitions
The club compete in a number of competitions, including:
 Forth and Endrick League
 Cameron Cup
 MacGregor Ferguson Cup
 The Telfer Trophy
 Margaret White Trophy

Honours

 Forth and Endrick League: 1982
 The Telfer Trophy: 1984
 Cameron Cup: 1957, 2018 
 Wybar Cup: 2014

References

Football clubs in Scotland
Football clubs in Stirling (council area)
1947 establishments in Scotland